The Bayeux Manuscript is an illustrated manuscript comprising one hundred three songs, collected by Charles III, Duke of Bourbon at the beginning of the 16th century and composed in the late 15th century, that is a few decades after the end of the Hundred Years' War. It is stored at the Bibliothèque nationale de France with designation Fr. 9346.

The Bayeux Manuscript is one of the only two secular monophonic French musical manuscripts from around 1500. The songs are largely of a popular and pastoral nature, unlike the courtly love songs of the previous century.

Songs 

 
 
 
 
 
 
 
 
 
 
 
 
  
 
 
 
  
 
 
 
 
 
 
 
 
 
 
 
 
 
 
  
 
  
 
  
 Hellas, ma dame
 
 
 
 Ma fame m'ayme
 Au feu, au feu
 Je trouvay la fillette
 Tres doulx penser
 Celle qui m'a demandé
 Puisque Robin j'ay a nom
 Je le lesray
 Triste plaisir
 Mais que ce fust le plaisir d'elle
 En despit des faulx medisans
 En ce premier jour de mai
 Vecy le may
 Adieu mes amours
 Et qui la dira, dira
 Le Roy Engloys
 La belle se siet au pié de la tour
 A mon jardin croist la fleur souveraine
 Jamais amoureux
 M'erme je n'ay point
 Dessoubz la branche
 Triste et pensif suis 
 Dieu la gard, la bergerotte
 Baisés moy
 L'aultre jour

References

Further reading 
 Théodore Gérold, Le Manuscrit de Bayeux, texte et musique d'un recueil de chansons du XVe siècle, Publication de la faculté des lettres de l'université de Strasbourg, Librairie Istria, Strasbourg, 1921

External links 
 Espérance, or: New Insights into the Origins of the Chansonnier de Bayeux
 The Bayeux Manuscript ed. Theodor Dumitrescu

16th-century manuscripts
Medieval music manuscript sources
Chansonniers (books)
Music illuminated manuscripts